Michael Peart (born 1948) is a Jamaican politician who was Speaker of House of Representatives. He was speaker in the House of Representatives from 2003–2007 and from January 17, 2012 – February 5, 2016.

He was a member of the House of Representatives from 1993 to 2016.

See also
List of speakers of the House of Representatives of Jamaica

References

1948 births
Living people
Speakers of the House of Representatives of Jamaica
People's National Party (Jamaica) politicians
20th-century Jamaican politicians
21st-century Jamaican politicians